Katsumoto Saotome (March 26, 1932 – May 10, 2022) was a Japanese writer and children's book author.

References

1932 births
2022 deaths
Japanese writers
Japanese children's writers
Japanese novelists
People from Tokyo